

Champions
National League: Boston Beaneaters
American Association: Philadelphia Athletics
Inter-State League: Brooklyn Atlantics
Northwestern League: Toledo Blue Stockings

Inter-league playoff:  Philadelphia (AA) declined to play Boston (NL)

Major league baseball final standings

National League final standings

American Association final standings

Statistical leaders

National League statistical leaders

American Association statistical leaders

Notable seasons

First baseman Dan Brouthers led the NL in batting average (.374), on-base percentage (.397), slugging percentage (.572), adjusted OPS+ (187), hits (159), total bases (243), and runs batted in (97).
Pitcher Charles Radbourn led the NL with 48 wins. He finished second in the NL in innings pitched (632.1), earned run average (2.05), adjusted ERA+ (150), and strikeouts (315).

Events

January–March
February 17 – The American Association and the National League, along with the Northwestern League, sign the Tripartite Agreement (also known as the National Agreement).  This agreement binds the leagues to respect each other's valid player contracts  as well as increasing the size of the reserve list from 6 to 11 players.  This leads to relative harmony among the leagues until the Players' League wars of 1889–1890.
March 14 – The Peoria Club of the Northwestern League makes a motion to ban blacks, a move directly aimed at Toledo's star catcher, Moses Fleetwood Walker.  After heated discussion, the motion is withdrawn and Walker remains eligible to play.
March 30 – Charles Fowle, one of the original founders of the National League, and secretary of the St. Louis Brown Stockings from 1875 to 1877, dies in St. Louis.
March 31 – The nation's oldest baseball club, the Olympic Town-Ball Club of Philadelphia, marks its 50th anniversary.

April–June
April 13 - U.S. President Chester A. Arthur invites members of the recently defunct Forest Cities franchise from the National Association to the white House, making it the first professional sports team to visit a president in Washington D.C. Later that year, the New York Gothams, the precursor to the New York Giants, also visits Arthur in D.C.
April 15 – Francis Richter publishes the first issue of Sporting Life which will grow into the leading weekly publication for baseball information and run continuously until 1917.
April 24 – Terry Larkin, a pitcher who has not played in the majors since 1880, shoots his wife and a policeman, then tries to kill himself.  He attempts suicide the next day and fails again.  Both his wife and the police officer survive as well, and Larkin will play in 40 games for the Richmond Virginians in 1884.
May 1 – In their inaugural National League game, the New York Gothams defeat the Boston Beaneaters 7–5 in front of 15,000 fans, who include President Ulysses S. Grant. The Philadelphia Quakers, also making their NL debut, lose 4–3 to the Providence Grays.
May 3 – John Montgomery Ward becomes the first pitcher to hit 2 home runs in a game as his New York Gothams defeat the Boston Beaneaters 10–9.
May 13 – In what was still a very rare occurrence, neither team commits an error as the St. Louis Browns defeat the Louisville Eclipse 4–3.
May 28 – Fort Wayne and Indianapolis play the first of 2 games under electric lights.
May 30 – Several of the American Association teams play a Memorial Day double-header in 2 different cities.  At one point, there is an American Association game being played at the Polo Grounds on the New York Metropolitans field and a National League game being played at the Polo Grounds on the New York Gothams field where the outfield fences back up to one another.
June 9 – The Philadelphia Quakers receive special permission from the National League to lower their ticket prices to 25¢ per game in order to compete with the Philadelphia Athletics of the American Association.  The Quakers average game attendance quadruples for the remainder of the season.
June 16 – The New York Gothams introduce ladies day, where all females are admitted free without restriction.  This idea will remain a staple of major league baseball for nearly 100 years.
June 28 – Providence Grays player Joe Mulvey is shot in the shoulder while leaving the playing field at Messer Street Grounds in Providence.  The shooter, James Murphy, was actually aiming for Mulvey's teammate, Cliff Carroll after Carroll had drenched Murphy with a hose.  Within a month, Mulvey would be sold to the Philadelphia Quakers.

July–September
July 3 – The Chicago White Stockings set a major league record with 14 doubles, including 4 each by Cap Anson and Abner Dalrymple, in a 31–7 pasting over the Buffalo Bisons. Chicago also set a Major League record for the most at bats by one team in a regulation nine-inning game, with 66.
July 4 – Tim Keefe of the New York Metropolitans wins both games of a double-header over the Columbus Buckeyes while giving up a combined 3 hits in the 2 games.
July 25 – Charles Radbourn throws a no-hitter for the Providence Grays.
July 26 – Joe Gephardt of the Louisville Eclipse is forced out of action  due to temporary paralysis.  Gephardt will recover and play again within 2 weeks.
July 28 – The first recorded game is played in Hawaii.
July 30 – Player/manager Lon Knight of the American Association Philadelphia Athletics hits for the cycle.  Philadelphia defeats the Pittsburgh Alleghenys, 17–4.
August 7 – The Providence Grays fall out of 1st place for good in their 6–4 loss to the Boston Beaneaters.  For the 2nd straight season, Providence will lead the league for the majority of the season and not win the pennant.
August 11 – The Boston Beaneaters turn a triple play when catcher Mike Hines catches a muffed pop-up and catches the base-runners off guard.
August 11 – Fred Thayer, patent-holder for the invention of the catching mask, and George Wright sue Wright's former teammate Albert Spalding's sporting goods company for patent infringement.  Spalding will ultimately be forced to pay Thayer royalties in the case.
August 20 – The Pittsburgh Alleghenys fine George Creamer, Mike Mansell and Billy Taylor $100 each and indefinitely suspend all 3 players for drunkenness.
August 21 – The Providence Grays defeat the Philadelphia Quakers 28–0 in the most lopsided shutout game in major league history.
August 29 – John Stricker of the Philadelphia Athletics gets 4 hits in a game against the Louisville Eclipse but sets a record by getting picked off 3 times by Eclipse pitcher Guy Hecker.  Benny Kauff of the New York Giants will tie Stricker's record in 1916.
September 6 – The Chicago White Stockings set a major league record by scoring 18 runs in the 7th inning in their 26–6 victory over the Detroit Wolverines.  Tom Burns goes 3–3 with 2 doubles and a home run in the outburst, setting records for most extra-base hits and runs scored in one inning by a player.
September 10 – Long John Reilly of the Cincinnati Red Stockings hits 2 inside the park home runs in a 12–6 win.
September 12 – The Union Association is officially formed in Pittsburgh
September 12 – Long John Reilly hits for the cycle and collects 6 hits in all, while teammate Hick Carpenter also garners 6 hits, as the Cincinnati Red Stockings pound the Pittsburgh Alleghenys 27–5.
September 13 – Hugh Daily of the Cleveland Blues pitches a no-hitter.
September 19 – Long John Reilly hits for the cycle for the 2nd time in a week as the Cincinnati Red Stockings beat the Philadelphia Athletics 12–3.
September 27 – The Boston Red Stockings clinch the National League pennant with a 4–1 win over the Cleveland Blues.
September 28 – The Philadelphia Athletics clinch the American Association flag with a 7–6 victory over the Louisville Eclipse.

October–December
November 22 – New York Gothams owner John B. Day proposes a resolution to prohibit a team from signing a player who has broken the reserve clause of his contract. This resolution, eventually adopted by both the American Association and National League, effectively changes the reserve clause from a device to protect owners from their own greediness to a vindictive weapon to be used against uncooperative players.
November 24 – The American Association agree to expand to 12 teams by admitting the Brooklyn Atlantics, Indianapolis Hoosiers, Toledo Blue Stockings and Washington Nationals.

Births

January–March
January 1 – Eddie Zimmerman
January 3 – Buck Hopkins
January 8 – Bob Ingersoll
January 27 – John McDonald
February 2 – Bill Abstein
February 4 – Doc Miller
February 5 – Dick Scott
February 8 – Joe Cassidy
February 13 – Hal Chase
February 13 – Harl Maggert
February 19 – Harry Curtis
February 25 – Jack Hannifin
March 1 – Charlie Pickett
March 4 – Chet Spencer
March 10 – Glenn Liebhardt
March 17 – Oscar Stanage
March 20 – Pep Clark
March 29 – Rube Dessau

April–June
April 4 – Bill Hinchman
April 4 – John Hummel
April 7 – Bill Cooney
April 8 – Shag Shaughnessy
April 10 – Tex Pruiett
April 13 – Mike Simon
April 22 – Carl Vandagrift
April 25 – Russ Ford
April 28 – Harry Gaspar
April 29 – Rube Manning
April 29 – Amby McConnell
April 29 – Bill McGilvray
May 5 – Gene Curtis
May 6 – Ed Karger
May 13 – Jimmy Archer
May 19 – Eddie Files
May 21 – Eddie Grant
May 25 – Heinie Heitmuller
June 6 – Jim St. Vrain
June 10 – Ernie Lindemann
June 16 – Al Mattern
June 16 – Red Waller
June 29 – Doc Martel

July–September
July 5 – Jack Quinn
July 5 – Josh Swindell
July 8 – Ducky Holmes
July 9 – Dave Shean
July 14 – Happy Smith
July 21 – Larry Pape
July 27 – Harry Kane
July 31 – Tommy Madden
July 31 – Red Munson
July 31 – Tuffy Stewart
August 4 – Lew Moren
August 7 – Tom Richardson
August 14 – Bill O'Hara
August 17 – Walt Justis
August 19 – George Ferguson
August 21 – Chief Wilson
August 23 – Red Downs
August 23 – Lew Richie
August 25 – Elmer Brown
August 27 – Baldy Louden
August 29 – Jimmie Savage
August 30 – Bill Brinker
August 30 – Sam Edmonston
August 31 – Syd Smith
September 3 – Art Fromme
September 5 – Lefty Leifield
September 6 – Dick Bayless
September 7 – John Flynn
September 17 – Leo Hafford
September 18 – Frank Manush
September 21 – Bris Lord
September 28 – Harley Young

October–December
October 3 – Phil Reardon
October 4 – Harry Ables
October 6 – Red Morgan
October 7 – Al Burch
October 7 – Phil Lewis
October 12 – Charlie French
October 13 – Walter Blair
October 13 – Harry Huston
October 16 – Lew Groh
October 16 – Will Harridge
October 19 – Walt Miller
October 20 – Cuke Barrows
October 22 – Bill Carrigan
October 28 – Frank Lange
October 29 – Del Mason
November 3 – Ed Lennox
November 5 – Otis Johnson
November 11 – Harry Billiard
November 16 – Rollie Zeider
November 20 – Ben Egan
November 20 – Harry Welchonce
November 26 – Frank Lobert
November 28 – Fred Osborn
November 30 – Ben Houser
December 4 – Jim Moroney
December 8 – Jimmy Wacker
December 10 – Jerry Upp
December 10 – Jim Stephens
December 17 – Rebel Oakes
December 18 – Hub Knolls
December 26 – Jimmy O'Rourke

Date of birth unknown
Mike McCormick
Bill Moriarty

Deaths
April 17 – John Bergh, 25, back-up catcher for the 1880 Boston Red Stockings.
July 5 – Charlie Guth, 27?, pitched a complete game victory in his only major league game in 1880 for the Chicago White Stockings.
September 21 – Dan Collins, 29, outfielder who played in 10 games from 1874 to 1876.
October 10 – Jim Devlin, 34, pitcher for the Louisville Grays in 1876–77 who led NL in games, innings, starts and strikeouts in its first season; expelled from baseball in the 1877 Louisville Grays scandal

See also 
 1882 in baseball
 1884 in baseball
 1885 in baseball

References

Sources
Nemec, David (1994). The Beer and Whiskey League: The Illustrated History of the American Association-Baseball's Renegade Major League. New York: Lyons & Burford, Publishers

External links
1883 National League season at Baseball-Reference.com
1883 American Association season at Baseball-Reference.com
Charlton's Baseball Chronology at BaseballLibrary.com
Year by Year History at Baseball-Almanac.com
Retrosheet.org